Paragon Finance plc v Nash [2001] EWCA Civ 1466 is an English contract law case concerning unfair contract terms.

Facts
Paragon (t/a National Home Loans Corporation plc until 1997) was claiming possession from Mr and Mrs Nash in South Norwood for late mortgage repayments. Paragon’s rate of interest was variable at its discretion. The Bank of England lowered its interest rate. Paragon did not ‘pass on’ the lower rate. Nash claimed that they were being made to pay substantially over the market rate of interest for secured loans, and were unable to find another lender because they had fallen into arrears. Mr & Mrs Nash argued that the interest rates were extortionate under the Consumer Credit Act 1974 section 138 (grossly exorbitant, grossly contravenes principles of fair trading; regard had to prevailing interest rates and risk).

Judgment
Dyson LJ held that the power to vary the interest rate at its discretion had to be exercised in a rational and honest way. This implied term was ‘necessary in order to give effect to the reasonable expectations of the parties.’ [36] and [42] However, in this case the bank was acting reasonably in protecting its interests. It was not grossly exorbitant. Nor was the term unfair under UCTA 1977 section 3(2)(b)(i), because part of the ‘contractual performance’ was the discretion and its exercise was what could be reasonably expected.

Thorpe LJ and Astill J concurred.

Significance
John McFall of the Treasury Select Committee said that banks are ‘defying the laws of financial arithmetic’ by not passing on the cuts in interest rates to consumers. For instance, Barclays is still charging 14.9% on credit card repayments, while the Bank’s rate is 3%.

See also

English contract law

Notes

References

English contract case law
Court of Appeal (England and Wales) cases
2001 in case law
2001 in British law